Greenhill School is a co-educational day school in Addison, Texas, United States. The school was founded in 1950 by Bernard Fulton. The school is the first co-educational, non-denominational pre-kindergarten through grade 12 school in Dallas and is a member of both the Independent Schools Association of the Southwest (ISAS) and the Southwest Preparatory Conference (SPC).

History

Greenhill School was founded in 1950 as a co-educational option among the independent schools in Dallas. From 1950 to 1976, Bernard Fulton served as the founding headmaster, and at the time, he introduced the concepts of independent co-education, the primer program, and open-space education while the school grew from 62 students to 1,002. After he retired from Greenhill School, he became the headmaster of Lakehill Preparatory School, and later, Fulton Academy in Rockwall, Texas, was named after him as well. On October 20, 1990, Governor Bill Clements declared Bernard Fulton Day “for his dedication to the education of young people in Dallas, in Texas, and in the nation."

From 1955 to 1959, late State Representative Fred Agnich of Dallas was chairman of the board of the Greenhill School and was instrumental in the early development of the institution.

The original Upper School building was a part of a farmhouse that was pre-existed the school. It also housed Greenhill's library, cafeteria, and administrative offices. In 1963, a fire decimated the Upper School building; it was rebuilt in 1974. The building suffered another fire in 1987 but reopened the following year.

Academics
The school is divided into four sections: Preschool, Lower School, Middle School, and the Upper School, which houses about 470 students in grades 9-12. 

Students are required to complete 48 hours of community service before graduating. The school is commonly known for having a rigorous program.

In addition to maintaining a top education program, Greenhill is home to several well decorated co-curriculars. Its Band, Orchestra, Debate, Film, and Quiz Bowl programs have all garnered numerous state and national awards for their efforts.

Traditions

The Water Tower
Each year, the incoming seniors paint the Water Tower in the parking lot with graffiti. They spray their names on it with an overriding theme and picture to depict their grade.

First Day of School
On the first day of school, students come to school on campus with a painted water tower. The senior class comes to school with females dressed in white and males dressed in black. The whole school also attends an assembly in the Phillips Gymnasium to ring in the new year.

Founder's Day
Founder's Day is the annual September 11 celebration of Greenhill's establishment on September 11, 1950.  The whole school meets in the Phillips Gymnasium for an assembly to commemorate two teachers and honor five faculty members. The Student Council President (a senior) lights the Founder's Day Candle with the current longest working faculty member. During the assembly, the Service-Learning and Community Service Program announces the Estelle Dickens service project for the year. Legacy Heart of the Hill groups are named during this assembly. The Heart of the Hill program brings groups of students from each division—Lower, Middle and Upper—together to help instill a sense of community across the campus.

Senior Breakfast
The Alumni Association holds the annual senior breakfast in the fall for the graduating seniors. During this time, the graduating seniors meet with alumni and are given their senior sweatshirts.

Athletics
Greenhill is a member of the Southwest Preparatory Conference which includes private schools from Texas and Oklahoma. Students start playing athletics for the school when they enter the 7th grade and are able to participate in Basketball, Baseball, Cheerleading, Cross Country, Diving, Golf, Field Hockey, Football, Lacrosse, Soccer, Softball, Swimming, Tennis, Track and Field, and Volleyball. 

Greenhill has had many prominent athletes. For example, Ashley Rape (Class of 2008) was selected as Gatorade Texas Girl Soccer Player of the Year and a Parade All-American who went on to play for played Duke University. Chelsey Sveinsson (Class of 2011) was Gatorade Texas Girls Cross Country Runner of the Year for 3 consecutive years. Sveinsson also won the 2008 Nike National Cross Country Championship.

The following records were found at the Greenhill Website and the Southwest Preparatory Conference Website. Due to the lack of retained information, some championships have not been recorded.

Notable alumni

 David Berman, musician, Silver Jews
 Jordan Carlos, comedian/actor
 Molly Erdman, actress, author and improvisational comedian
 Lesli Linka Glatter, Emmy-nominated film and television director, president of the Directors Guild of America
 Mila Hermanovski, fashion designer, Project Runway Season 7 finalist and Project Runway: All Stars contestant
 Ilyse Hogue, progressive activist, former NARAL Pro-Choice America president
 Rashad Hussain, American attorney, diplomat, and professor
 Jackie 'Butch' Jenkins, actor
 Eric Johnson, 60th Mayor of Dallas and former member of the Texas House of Representatives
 Ronald Judkins, winner of the Academy Award for Best Sound for the films Jurassic Park and Saving Private Ryan
 R. F. Kuang, novelist and fantasy author of The Poppy War 
 Aaron Kurz, classical pianist
 Anthony Lovett, author, actor, director
 Martie Maguire, musician, The Chicks, Court Yard Hounds
 Cooper Raiff, filmmaker and actor; winner of the 2022 Audience Award at the Sundance Film Festival for Cha Cha Real Smooth
 Emily Robison, musician, The Chicks, Court Yard Hounds
 Lela Rose, fashion designer
 Scott Rothkopf, chief curator, Whitney Museum of American Art
 Iliza Shlesinger, comedian, actress and television host
 Grant Solomon, tennis player
 Rob Stone, actor and documentary producer/director
 Karen Rupert Toliver, Executive Vice President of Sony Pictures, winner of the Academy Award for Best Animated Short Film for Hair Love
 Beth Van Duyne, U.S. Representative for Texas' 24th Congressional District and former mayor of Irving, Texas

References

External links

Greenhill School Website

Addison, Texas
Educational institutions established in 1950
Independent Schools Association of the Southwest
Private K-12 schools in Dallas County, Texas
1950 establishments in Texas